The following is a list of notable deaths in May 2014.

Entries for each day are listed alphabetically by surname. A typical entry lists information in the following sequence:
Name, age, country of citizenship and reason for notability, established cause of death, reference.

May 2014

1
John Allan, 86, Canadian naval officer.
Adamu Atta, 86, Nigerian politician, Governor of Kwara State (1979–1983), member of the House of Representatives (1976–1979).
Bjørn Barth, 83, Norwegian diplomat.
Juan de Dios Castillo, 63, Mexican football player and coach (Cruz Azul, Honduras, El Salvador), skin cancer.
Chou Meng-tieh, 92, Taiwanese poet and writer, multiple organ dysfunction syndrome.
Clive Clark, 73, English footballer (West Bromwich Albion).
Mel Clark, 87, American baseball player (Philadelphia Phillies).
Radhia Cousot, 66, French computer scientist.
Arthur Cromarty, 94, American judge, member of the New York Supreme Court, heart failure.
Helgi Daníelsson, 85, Icelandic footballer.
Assi Dayan, 68, Israeli film director and actor.
Mark Elvins, 74, British priest and author, Warden of Greyfriars, Oxford (2007–2008).
Hellmut Federhofer, 102, Austrian musicologist.
Gordon H. Fitzgerald, 87, Canadian politician and lawyer, Nova Scotia MLA for Halifax (1960–1970), Speaker (1969–1970).
Juan Formell, 71, Cuban Grammy Award-winning musician, composer and director (Los Van Van).
Allen Kent, 92, American computer scientist.
Spike Maynard, 71, American judge, member of the Supreme Court of Appeals of West Virginia (1996–2008).
Peggy O'Shea, 91, American Daytime Emmy Award-winning screenwriter (One Life to Live), complications from a stroke.
John Wash Pam, 73, Nigerian politician, Senator for Plateau State, complications from prostate cancer.
William F. Poe, 82, American politician, Mayor of Tampa, Florida (1974–1979).
Paul Ramsay, 78, Australian billionaire health care (Ramsay Health Care), football (Sydney FC) and media (Prime Television) executive and philanthropist, heart attack.
Peter Ruscuklic, 58, Australian VFL player (Fitzroy, Geelong).
Heinz Schenk, 89, German television presenter and actor.
Howard Smith, 77, American columnist (The Village Voice) and filmmaker (Marjoe), cancer.
David Stoliar, 91, Romanian World War II soldier, sole survivor of the Struma disaster.
Georg Stollenwerk, 83, German football player and coach (1. FC Köln).
Kenneth Tomlinson, 69, American magazine editor (Reader's Digest) and media executive, chairman of the Corporation for Public Broadcasting, melanoma.
Manfred von Richthofen, 80, German sports official, Director of the Deutscher Olympischer Sportbund (1994–2006).
Paul Whetnall, 67, English badminton player and coach.
Eli Woods, 91, English comedian and comic actor.
Barbara Worley, 79, Australian sports administrator.
Kōji Yada, 81, Japanese voice actor (One Piece, Dragon Ball Z), kidney failure.

2
Tomás Balduino, 91, Brazilian Roman Catholic prelate, Bishop of Goiás (1967–1998).
Sir Bill Benyon, 84, British politician, MP for Buckingham (1970–1983) and Milton Keynes (1983–1992).
George Herbert Borts, 86, American economist.
Chelokee, 10, American thoroughbred racehorse, euthanized.
Jaroslav Cihlář, 90, Czech Olympic cyclist.
Jessica Cleaves, 65, American singer (The Friends of Distinction, Earth, Wind & Fire), complications from a stroke.
Martin Dent, 88, British academic, co-founder of Jubilee 2000.
George Digby, 96, American baseball scout (Boston Red Sox).
John E. Dolibois, 95, American diplomat, Ambassador to Luxembourg (1981–1985), last survivor of Nuremberg trials interrogation team.
John Dungs, 62, Nigerian military officer, Governor of Delta State (1996–1998).
Elio Guzzanti, 93, Italian doctor and politician, Minister of Health (1995–1996).
Anwar Ahmed Khan, 80, Pakistani field hockey player, Olympic champion (1960) and dual silver medalist (1956, 1964).
Andrey Korneyev, 40, Russian swimmer, Olympic bronze medalist (1996) and European aquatics champion (1995, 1997), stomach cancer.
Mohammad-Reza Lotfi, 67, Iranian classical musician, cancer.
Charles Marowitz, 80, American playwright, stage director and theatre critic, complications from Parkinson's disease.
Moni Maker, 21, American trotter horse, Harness Horse of the Year (1998, 1999), complications from colic surgery.
Marin Niculescu, 91, Romanian Olympic cyclist.
Žarko Petan, 85, Slovene writer.
Pom, 94, Belgian comic writer and artist.
Nigel Stepney, 55, British Formula One mechanic (Ayrton Senna, Michael Schumacher), involved in 2007 Formula One espionage controversy, traffic collision.
Pauline Wagner, 103, American actress and glamour girl.
Efrem Zimbalist Jr., 95, American actor (The F.B.I., 77 Sunset Strip, Batman: The Animated Series).

3
Agshin Alizadeh, 76, Soviet and Azerbaijani composer.
Kofi Ansah, 62, Ghanaian fashion designer.
Gary Becker, 83, American economist, Nobel Prize laureate in Economics (1992), complications following surgery.
Leslie Carlson, 81, American-born Canadian actor (A Christmas Story, The Fly, The X-Files), cancer.
Bruce Crabtree, 90, American architect and politician.
Imre Danka, 83, Hungarian footballer.
Vicki Darken, 91, Australian painter.
James H. Daughdrill, Jr., 80, American educator, President of Rhodes College (1973–1999).
Dick Douglas, 82, Scottish politician, MP for Clackmannan and Eastern Stirlingshire (1970–1974), Dunfermline (1979–1983) and Dunfermline West (1983–1992).
Bobby Gregg, 78, American drummer (Bob Dylan, Simon & Garfunkel) and record producer.
Ben Hoberman, 92, American radio executive (KABC, ABC Radio), pioneered talk radio format in the United States, complications from lung cancer.
Francisco Icaza, 83, Mexican modernist artist and writer.
Chet Jastremski, 73, American swimmer, Olympic bronze medalist (1964) and 100-meter breaststroke world-record holder.
Trine Krogh, 59, Norwegian Olympic swimmer (1972).
Jim Oberstar, 79, American politician, member of the US House of Representatives for Minnesota's 8th District (1975–2011).
John Westergaard, 86, British sociologist.
John Hartley Williams, 72, British poet, cancer.

4
Jack Agüeros, 79, American community activist, Alzheimer's disease.
Eddie Andreini, 77, American stunt pilot, air crash.
Kojo Armah, 68, Ghanaian diplomat, lawyer and politician.
Dick Ayers, 90, American comic book artist (Fantastic Four, Ghost Rider, Sgt. Fury and his Howling Commandos).
Elena Baltacha, 30, Ukrainian-born British tennis player, liver cancer.
William Bender, 83, American entertainment critic and magazine editor (Time), heart failure.
Edgar Cortright, 90, American scientist and engineer.
Pierre Derivery, 88, French Olympic sprint canoer.
Mike Hawker, 77, English songwriter.
Nestor Jacono, 89, Maltese Olympic sprinter (1948).
Helga Königsdorf, 75, East German physicist and author, Parkinson's disease.
Ross Lonsberry, 67, Canadian hockey player (Philadelphia Flyers, Los Angeles Kings, Pittsburgh Penguins), cancer.
Jean-Paul Ngoupandé, 65, Central African politician, Prime Minister (1996–1997).
Al Pease, 92, British-born Canadian Hall of Fame racing driver (Formula One).
Andrew Quintero, 51, American scientist and entrepreneur (JumpStartFund), drowned.
Tatiana Samoilova, 80, Soviet-born Russian actress (The Cranes Are Flying, Anna Karenina), People's Artist (1993), complications from a heart condition.
Dana Seetahal, 58, Trinidadian politician and legal academic, MP (2002–2010), shot.
Tony Settember, 87, Filipino-born American racing driver and engineer.
Bohdan Skaradziński, 83, Polish writer and social activist.
Phyllis Stern, 88,  American professor and nursing theorist.
William Worthy, 92, American newspaper journalist, challenged travel restrictions to Communist countries, complications from Alzheimer's disease.

5
Timothy John Byford, 72, British-born Serbian television director, multiple myeloma.
Butler Derrick, 77, American politician, member of the House of Representatives for South Carolina (1975–1995) and SC House of Representatives (1969–1975), cancer.
Dave Diamond, 77, American radio disc jockey and rock music journalist, pneumonia.
Billy Frank, Jr., 83, American Nisqually tribal fishing rights activist.
Jean Gaven, 92, French film actor.
Daniel R. Gernatt, Sr., 97, American businessman.
Elaine Green, 73, American television journalist (WCPO), recipient of the Peabody Award (1981).
Harold Haering, 83, American politician, member of the Kentucky House of Representatives, Senator (1983–1988).
Amik Kasoruho, 81, Albanian author and publicist, pulmonary disease.
Eduardo Mac Entyre, 85, Argentine artist.
Lorne Maeck, 88, Canadian politician.
István Major, 64, Hungarian Olympic high jumper (1972, 1976).
Michael Otedola, 87, Nigerian politician, Governor of Lagos State (1999–2007), complications from a stroke.
Sven Sønsteby, 80, Norwegian illustrator.
Jackie Lynn Taylor, 88, American actress and television personality (Our Gang), Alzheimer's disease.
Lynn R. Williams, 89, Canadian labor unionist, President of the United Steelworkers (1983–1994), Parkinson's disease.

6
Wil Albeda, 88, Dutch politician, Minister of Social Affairs (1977–1981), member of the Senate (1966–1977, 1981–1983).
Virginia Belmont, 92, American actress.
William H. Dana, 83, American NASA test pilot (X-15 rocket), complications from Parkinson's disease.
Georges Delahaie, 80, French sculptor.
Roger Dimmock, 78, British rear admiral, Naval Secretary (1985–1987).
Jimmy Ellis, 74, American boxer, WBA heavyweight champion (1968–1970), dementia.
Billy Harrell, 85, American baseball (Cleveland Indians) and basketball player (Siena Saints).
Antony Hopkins, 93, British composer, conductor and pianist.
Larry Ivie, 77, American comic artist and writer, lung cancer.
Maria Lassnig, 94, Austrian artist.
Livio Maritano, 88, Italian Roman Catholic prelate, Bishop of Acqui (1979–2000).
Farley Mowat, 92, Canadian author (People of the Deer, Lost in the Barrens, Never Cry Wolf).
Bill Nunn, 89, American editor (Pittsburgh Courier) and football executive (Pittsburgh Steelers), complications from a stroke.
William Olvis, 56, American film and television music composer (Dr. Quinn, Medicine Woman), throat cancer.
Bud Osborn, 66, Canadian poet and activist.
Học Phi, 101, Vietnamese dramatist and scriptwriter.
Aziz Sattar, 88, Malaysian actor, complications from a heart attack.
Leslie Thomas, 83, Welsh author (The Virgin Soldiers).
Cedric Thornberry, 77, British lawyer, Assistant-Secretary-General of the United Nations.
Lex Watson, 71, Australian LGBT rights activist and political scientist.
Lois Rhame West, 92, American healthcare and physical fitness advocate (Muscular Dystrophy Association), First Lady of South Carolina (1971–1975).

7
*Al Bahathri, 32, American-bred British-trained Thoroughbred racehorse. (death announced on this date)
Nazim Al-Haqqani, 92, Cypriot Islamic Sufism prelate and scholar, multiple organ failure.
Raúl Baca Carbo, 82, Ecuadorian engineer and politician.
Sir George Christie, 79, British opera manager (Glyndebourne Festival Opera).
Stanford Darger, 93, American politician, member of the Utah House of Representatives.
Manuel Jiménez de Parga, 85, Spanish politician.
Pierre Descaves, 89, French politician.
Dale Evans, 77, American football player.
Tony Genaro, 72, American actor (Tremors, World Trade Center, The Mask of Zorro), natural causes.
Ramón Vega Hidalgo, 80, Chilean military officer and politician, Commander-in-chief of the Air Force (1991–1995).
Zundel Kroizer, 89, Israeli rabbi.
Sir Neville McNamara, 91, Australian defence chief.
Samrath Lal Meena, 79, Indian politician, Rajasthan MLA for Rajgarh, Speaker (1998–1999).
William Meyers, 70, South African featherweight boxer, Olympic bronze medalist (1960).
Colin Pillinger, 70, British planetary scientist, brain haemorrhage.
David Prentice, 77, British artist.
Wilbur Rakestraw, 85, American race car driver (NASCAR), heart failure.
Rashid Rehman, 55, Pakistani lawyer, shot.
Elaine Sturtevant, 89, American pop and minimalist artist.
Kelly E. Taggart, 81, American rear admiral and civil engineer, director of the National Oceanic and Atmospheric Administration Commissioned Officer Corps.
Dick Welteroth, 86, American baseball player (Washington Senators).
Martha Wilkinson, 72, American literacy campaigner, First Lady of Kentucky (1987–1991), natural causes.
Lawrence Williams, 59, Guyanese finance official, Governor for the Bank of Guyana (since 2005), cancer.

8
Bill Coughlin, 91, American newspaper journalist (Los Angeles Times), editor (Washington Daily News) and novelist, Pulitzer Prize winner for Public Service (1990).
Roger L. Easton, 93, American scientist, inventor and designer of GPS.
Jens Christian Hansen, 82, Norwegian geographer.
George Kohut, 70, Ukrainian-born American camera operator (Batman Begins, Ferris Bueller's Day Off, The Fugitive).
Yago Lamela, 36, Spanish Olympic athlete (2000, 2004), heart attack.
Homero Leite Meira, 82, Brazilian Roman Catholic prelate, Bishop of Itabuna (1978–1980) and Irecê (1980–1983).
Beverly Long, 81, American actress (Rebel Without a Cause, Father Knows Best).
Nancy Malone, 79, American Emmy Award-winning producer, director (Dynasty) and actress (Naked City), leukemia-induced pneumonia.
Leo Marentette, 73, American baseball player (Detroit Tigers, Montreal Expos), heart attack.
Charlie Mead, 93, Canadian baseball player (New York Giants).
Harry Potter, 72, Australian television journalist (Ten Eyewitness News), cancer.
Allan Potts, 79, New Zealand Olympic track and field coach, official and runner, President of Athletics New Zealand (2002–2003), bone cancer.
Geoff Richards, 85, English footballer (West Brom), pneumonia.
Jair Rodrigues, 75, Brazilian musician and singer, heart attack.
Mercedes Salisachs, 97, Spanish writer.
Vladimir Nikolaevich Smirnov, 67, Russian footballer.
R. Douglas Stuart, Jr., 98, American food executive and diplomat, CEO of Quaker Oats Company (1966–1981), Ambassador to Norway (1984–1989), heart attack.
Robert Symms, 83, American photographer.
Joseph P. Teasdale, 78, American politician, Governor of Missouri (1977–1981), complications from pneumonia.
Harry Weltman, 81, American basketball executive (Cleveland Cavaliers, New Jersey Nets), complications from Alzheimer's disease.
Alan Woodman, 58, Australian VFL football player (Geelong).
Tommie Wright, 95, American pianist and composer (Florida State Seminoles fight song).

9
Graeme Acton, 63, Australian cattle baron, injuries sustained in campdrafting accident.
Giacomo Bini, 75, Italian Franciscan priest, Minister General of the Order of Friars Minor (1997–2003).
Eugen Dombois, 82, German lutenist and music teacher.
Bob Duynstee, 93, Dutch politician, member of the House of Representatives (1956–1967) and State Secretary for Defence (1967–1971).
Terry Farmer, 82, English footballer (Rotherham United, York City).
Flossie Gomile-Chidyaonga, Malawian diplomat involved in leaked diplomatic cable controversy, High Commissioner to Tanzania (since 2011).
Stephen Hall, 72, American politician.
Bob Hoysted, 88, Australian racehorse trainer (Manikato, Rose of Kingston, Sydeston).
Donald Kirkpatrick, 90, American academic and author.
Harlan Mathews, 87, American politician, US Senator from Tennessee (1993–1994), brain cancer.
Galindo Mellado Cruz, 41, Mexican drug lord, a founder of Los Zetas, shot.
Jules Mutebusi, 54, Congolese militant.
Janaky Athi Nahappan, 89, Malaysian independence fighter, founding member of the MIC, pneumonia.
Mel Patton, 89, American sprinter, double Olympic champion (1948) and world record holder for 100- and 220-yard dashes.
N. Janardhana Reddy, 79, Indian politician, AP MLA (1989–1994) and Chief Minister (1990–1992), RS MP (1972–1978, 2009–2014), LS MP (1998–2009), liver disease.
Selim Sesler, 57, Turkish clarinet player.
Mary Stewart, 97, British novelist (Merlin series), heart failure.
Frank Strazzeri, 84, American jazz pianist.
Donald Tandy, 95, British actor (EastEnders).
Joe Wilder, 92, American jazz trumpeter, heart failure.
Jorge Zavala, 91, Ecuadorian politician.

10
Carmen Alardín, 80, Mexican poet, writer and translator.
Yeso Amalfi, 88, Brazilian footballer (Olympique de Marseille).
Carmen Argibay, 74, Argentine judge, member of the Supreme Court (since 2005), heart attack.
Marie Dean Arrington, 80, American convicted murderer.
Miguel Brascó, 87, Argentine writer.
Andrés Carrasco, 67, Argentine neurologist, challenged Monsanto over safety of glyphosate.
Maurice Casey, 71, British scholar.
Ronnie Caveness, 71, American football player (Arkansas Razorbacks), melanoma.
José Cestero, 76, Puerto Rican basketball player.
Brij Bihari Chaubey, 73, Indian academic.
Gene Chyzowych, 79, Ukrainian-born American soccer player and coach (national team, New York Apollo), cancer.
Rhoda Dorsey, 86, American historian and college president.
Lem Johns, 88, American Secret Service agent (Lyndon B. Johnson).
Mari Kinsigo, 67, Estonian chess player.
Patrick Lucey, 96, American politician and diplomat, Governor of Wisconsin (1971–1977), Ambassador to Mexico (1977–1979).
Nash the Slash, 66, Canadian rock musician (FM).
Lane Penn, 74, New Zealand rugby union executive, President of the NZRU (2001–2003).
Gottlieb Perren, 88, Swiss Olympic skier.
André Popp, 90, French composer.
José Falcó Sanmartín, 97, Spanish fighter pilot.
Patrick Woodroffe, 74, British fantasy, surrealist and record jacket artist, Pick's disease.
Viktor Yerokhin, 74, Russian football coach and player.

11
Sidney Blatt, 85, American psychotherapist.
Ismail Boçari, 96–97, Albanian professor.
Marcel Bon, 89, French mycologist.
Yvonne Cartier, 86, New Zealand ballet dancer and instructor.
Gérard Drainville, 83, Canadian Roman Catholic prelate, Bishop of Amos (1978–2004).
Thelma Eisen, 92, American baseball player (AAGPBL).
Corinne Freeman, 87, American politician, Mayor of St. Petersburg, Florida (1977–1985), cancer.
Ed Gagliardi, 62, American bass guitarist (Foreigner), cancer.
Reg Gasnier, 74, Australian Hall of Fame rugby league player (St. George Dragons) and national team captain.
Tarakant Jha, 86, Indian politician.
Paul Kinsman, 83, Canadian politician, Nova Scotia MLA for West Kings (1963–1967), Kings South (1984).
Barbara Knudson, 86, American actress (Meet Danny Wilson, The Jayhawkers!, The Cry Baby Killer).
Kaare Kroppan, 81, Norwegian actor.
Camille Lepage, 26, French photojournalist.
Jeb Stuart Magruder, 79, American presidential aide (Richard Nixon), convicted for conspiracy to obstruct justice and wiretapping (Watergate scandal), complications from a stroke.
Guy Morton, Jr., 83, American baseball player (Boston Red Sox).
Celso Pereira de Almeida, 86, Brazilian Roman Catholic prelate, Bishop of Porto Nacional (1976–1995) and Itumbiara (1995–1998).
Margareta Pogonat, 81, Romanian actress.
Sir David Rowlands, 66, British civil servant.
Francisco Sobrino, 82, Spanish sculptor.
Martin Špegelj, 86, Croatian politician and army officer, Minister of Defence (1990–1991).
Harry Stopes-Roe, 90, British philosopher and humanist, Vice President of the British Humanist Association.
Ivan Wingreen, 52, South African-born Australian cricketer, brain tumour.

12
Babis Angourakis, 63, Greek politician, MP for Athens (1997–2000), MEP for the KKE (since 2009), aneurysm.
Alan Bestic, 92, Irish journalist.
Cornell Borchers, 89, Lithuanian-born German actress (The Big Lift, Istanbul).
Isabel Carrasco, 59, Spanish politician, shot.
Marco Cé, 88, Italian Roman Catholic cardinal, Patriarch of Venice (1978–2002).
Petro Chernyaha, 68, Ukrainian scientist and public figure.
Jacinto Convit, 100, Venezuelan physician, scientist and researcher, developed vaccines against leprosy and leishmaniasis.
Lynne Cohen, 69, American-born Canadian photographer, lung cancer.
Terry Cook, 66, Canadian archivist, cancer.
Keith Crisco, 71, American politician, fall.
William J.D. Escher, 82, American aerospace engineer.
Billie Fleming, 100, English long-distance cyclist.
H. R. Giger, 74, Swiss surrealist artist (Alien), Oscar winner (1980), injuries from a fall.
Svetlana Grigoryan, 83, Armenian actress.
Tom Hafey, 82, Australian AFL football player (Richmond) and coach (Richmond, Collingwood, Geelong, Sydney), cancer.
Cornelia Groefsema Kennedy, 90, American judge, 6th Cir. Court of Appeals (1979–1999), member (1970–1979) and Chief Judge (1977–1979) of the US District Court of E. Mich.
Ineke Lambers-Hacquebard, 68, Dutch politician, cancer.
Ľudovít Lehen, 88, Slovakian painter and chess composer.
Brian Marchinko, 65, Canadian ice hockey player (Toronto Maple Leafs, New York Islanders).
Hugh McLeod, 81, Scottish rugby union player.
Joe Mence, 93, British cricketer (Berkshire).
Min Huifen, 69, Chinese erhu master and composer, cerebral hemorrhage.
Daud Mirza, 45, Pakistani-born Norwegian actor.
Pál Orosz, 80, Hungarian football player and coach, Olympic bronze medalist (1960).
Ralph Peduto, 72, American actor (The Rock, Mrs. Doubtfire) and playwright, leukemia.
Ruben T. Profugo, 76, Filipino Roman Catholic prelate, Bishop of Lucena (1982–2003).
Sarat Pujari, 79, Indian actor, heart attack.
Leroy Serisier, 86, Australian politician, member of the New South Wales Legislative Council (1970–1978).
Hugh Smyth, 73, Northern Irish politician, Leader of the Progressive Unionist Party (1979–2002), Lord Mayor of Belfast (1994–1995).
Sudhir, 70, Indian film actor (Satte Pe Satta).
James Walston, 65, British political scientist, cancer.
A. J. Watson, 90, American Hall of Fame race car builder and mechanic (Pat Flaherty).
Lorenzo Zambrano, 70, Mexican building material executive, CEO of Cemex.

13
Máximo Alcócer, 81, Bolivian footballer.
David Malet Armstrong, 87, Australian philosopher.
Martin Barreras, 49, American noncommissioned officer, Army Ranger Sergeant Major in charge of the rescue of Jessica Lynch, wounds sustained in combat.
John Barritt, 98, British Bermudian politician, BMP for Devonshire South, Speaker (1979–1989).
Malik Bendjelloul, 36, Swedish documentarian (Searching for Sugar Man), Oscar winner (2013), suicide.
Gilles Cloutier, 85, Canadian physicist, Rector of the Université de Montréal (1985–1993).
J. F. Coleman, 95, American military and test pilot (Convair XFY Pogo), winner of the Harmon Trophy (1954), natural causes.
Fred Dunsmore, 84, Canadian ice hockey player (Winnipeg Maroons).
Hamad Khalaily, 85, Israeli politician, member of the Knesset (1981–1984).
Miodrag Rakić, 39, Serbian politician.
Altamiro Rossato, 88, Brazilian Roman Catholic prelate, Bishop of Marabá (1985–1989), Archbishop of Porto Alegre (1991–2001).
Mohammad Baqer Shirazi, 82, Iranian Grand Ayatollah.
Rowena Spencer, 91, American pediatric surgeon.
Ron Stevens, 64, Canadian politician, Alberta MLA for Calgary-Glenmore (1997–2009). (death announced on this date)
Anthony Villanueva, 69, Filipino featherweight boxer, Olympic silver medalist (1964), heart attack.
Tessa Watts, 68, British music video producer ("Sledgehammer"), pancreatic cancer.
Morning Glory Zell-Ravenheart, 65, American neopagan, author and priestess (Church of All Worlds), multiple myeloma.

14
Diane Barz, 70, American judge, first female member of the Montana Supreme Court (1989–1990), cancer.
Hazel Rodney Blackman, 93, American fashion designer, quilter, and painter.
Bruce Bowley, 92, Australian cricketer.
Douglas Cummings, 67, British cellist (London Symphony Orchestra).
John M. Fitzpatrick, 65, British urologist, subarachnoid haemorrhage.
Gisela Kessler, 78, German trade unionist.
Jeffrey Kruger, 83, British music business executive (Flamingo Club, Ember Records).
Emanuel Raymond Lewis, 85, American librarian and author.
Alexander Murray MacBeath, 90, British mathematician.
Leonard Quilty, 94, Canadian politician, member of the Legislative Assembly of Ontario (1958–1975).
Sam W. Russell, 68, American politician, member of the Texas House of Representatives (1983–1992).
Morvin Simon, 70, New Zealand Māori composer, kapa haka leader and historian.
Warren Keith Sinclair, 90, New Zealand physicist.
Martin Skowroneck, 87, German harpsichord builder.
Stephen Sutton, 19, British charity fundraiser, colorectal cancer.
Terry Wire, 73, British politician, Mayor of Northampton, cancer.

15
George J. Armelagos, 77, American anthropologist, pancreatic cancer.
Peter Ayerst, 93, British World War II fighter and test pilot (Supermarine Spitfire).
Terry Bell, 69, English footballer (Reading).
Hans Breidbach-Bernau, 93, Austrian Olympic writer 1948.
Robert Burns, 77, Canadian politician, Quebec MNA for Maisonneuve (1970–1979).
Jean-Luc Dehaene, 73, Belgian politician, Prime Minister (1992–1999), fall.
M. B. Etheredge, 98, American politician and World War II army officer, awarded Texas Legislative Medal of Honor.
Robert J. Flynn, 76, American naval officer, Vietnam War POW held in China (1967–1973).
Greg Hughes, 75, Irish Gaelic football player (Offaly GAA).
M B Manik, 43, Bangladeshi filmmaker, shot.
Michael Mence, 70, British cricketer (Berkshire).
Jan Mucha, 72, Polish speedway motorcycle rider, cancer.
Jean Oury, 90, French psychiatrist and psychoanalyst, pancreatic cancer.
I. M. Jayarama Shetty, 63, Indian politician, MP for Udupi (1998–1999).
Norifumi Suzuki, 80, Japanese film director (Torakku Yarō).
Ed Swearingen, 88, American aeronautical engineer.
Carlo Weber, 80, German architect (Auer+Weber+Assoziierte).
Nahum Zolotov, 88, Israeli architect.
Robert Zwanzig, 86, American physicist.

16
Charlie Boney, 89, American architect.
Benaouda Boudjellal, Algerian footballer.
Vera Dajht-Kralj, 85, Croatian sculptor.
Amalendu De, 84–85, Indian historian.
Dehere, 23, American Thoroughbred racehorse.
Chris Duckworth, 81, South African cricketer.
Vito Favero, 81, Italian road racing cyclist.
Allan Folsom, 72, American novelist (The Day After Tomorrow), metastatic melanoma.
Nicola Ghiuselev, 77, Bulgarian operatic bass.
Bud Hollowell, 71, American baseball player and manager.
Zil-e-Huma, 70, Pakistani singer, renal disease and diabetes.
Oleksiy Korobeinikov, 36, Ukrainian Olympic biathlete.
Russi Mody, 96, Indian steel and airline executive, President of Tata Steel, Indian Airlines and Air India, recipient of the Padma Bhushan (1989).
Aleksandr Shumeyko, Kyrgyzstani Soviet football manager.
Clyde Snow, 86, American forensic anthropologist, cancer and emphysema.
Viktor Sukhodrev, 81, Soviet-born Russian interpreter (Nikita Khrushchev, Leonid Brezhnev).
Ruth Tarvydas, 66–67, Australian fashion designer, fall.
Louise Wilson, 52, British fashion academic (Central Saint Martins).

17
Catherine M. Abate, 66, American politician, member of the New York Senate (1994–1998), uterine cancer.
David Abbott, 76, British advertising executive and copywriter.
Hussein al-Imam, 63, Egyptian actor and musician.
Ursula Benedix, 91, German politician.
Olivier Chesneau, 42, French astronomer.
Gerald Edelman, 84, American biologist, Nobel Prize laureate in Physiology or Medicine (1972), natural causes.
Clarence Ellis, 71, American computer scientist.
John Gardiner, 71, Australian Olympic basketball player.
Matt Kailey, 59, American author and transgender activist, heart failure.
Jerrold E. Lomax, 87, American architect.
Hiram Mann, 92, American military officer and pilot, Army Lt. Col. for the Tuskegee Airmen 332nd Fighter Group.
Bongani Masuku, 50, South African singer (Johnny Clegg), shot.
Miss Beazley, 9, American-born Scottish terrier, co-First Dog (2005–2009), euthanized due to lymphoma.
C. P. Krishnan Nair, 92, Indian hotelier, founder and chairman of The Leela Palaces, Hotels and Resorts, recipient of the Padma Bhushan (2010).
Paul Victor Obeng, 66, Ghanaian economic advisor, asthma.
Bob Odom, 78, American politician and power broker.
Anna Pollatou, 30, Greek rhythmic gymnast, Olympic bronze medalist (2000), traffic collision.
Źmicier Sidarovič, 48, Belarusian musician, singer and piper.

Notable Laotian people killed in the Lao People's Liberation Army Air Force An-74 crash:
Soukanh Mahalath, 59, Governor of Vientiane, Minister of Finance (2001–2006), Governor of the Bank of the Lao P.D.R. (1999–2001).
Douangchay Phichit, 70, Deputy Prime Minister, Minister of Defense (since 2001).
Thongbanh Sengaphone, 61, Minister of Public Security (since 2005).
Cheuang Sombounkhanh, Secretariat of the Central Party Committee, Governor of the Bank of the Lao P.D.R. (1997–1999).

18
Per Almar Aas, 84, Norwegian politician.
Lykourgos Angelopoulos, 73, Greek cantor (Greek Byzantine Choir).
Arizal, 71, Indonesian director.
General Baker, 72, American labor unionist and politician.
Dobrica Ćosić, 92, Serbian writer and politician, President of the Federal Republic of Yugoslavia (1992–1993).
Hans-Peter Dürr, 84, German physicist.
Michel Feron, 91, Belgian Olympic alpine skier.
Radu Florescu, 88, Romanian-born French historian, complications from pneumonia.
Hussein Isaac, Syrian Major General.
Kaiketsu Masateru, 66, Japanese sumo wrestler (Ozeki) and executive, Chairman of the Japan Sumo Association (2010–2012), ischemic heart disease.
A. Malarmannan, 77, Indian politician.
Don Meyer, 69, American basketball coach (Hamline Pipers, Lipscomb Bisons, Northern State Wolves), carcinoid cancer.
Chukwuedu Nwokolo, 93, Nigerian doctor and medical researcher.
Wubbo Ockels, 68, Dutch physicist and astronaut, first Dutch citizen in space, renal cell cancer.
Francis T. Purcell, 95, American politician, member of the New York Assembly (1964–1965).
Claude Lavoie Richer, 84, Canadian Olympic cross country skier (1952).
Per Rollum, 85, Norwegian Olympic alpine skier (1952).
Jerry Vale, 83, American singer ("Have You Looked into Your Heart", "The Star-Spangled Banner") and actor.
Morris Weiss, 98, American cartoonist (Mickey Finn).
Gordon Willis, 82, American cinematographer (The Godfather, Annie Hall, Manhattan), cancer.

19
Michael Aldrich, 72, British inventor.
Simon Andrews, 31, British motorcycle racer, head injuries sustained in a race collision.
Sir Jack Brabham, 88, Australian racing driver, triple Formula One world champion (1959, 1960, 1966).
Elombe Brath, 77, American activist.
Peter Buchanan, 70, Australian judge.
*Count Suckle, 82, Jamaican-born British sound system operator and club owner, heart attack.
Peter Curtin, 70, Australian actor.
Franz-Paul Decker, 90, German-born Canadian conductor (Montreal Symphony Orchestra, Cologne Opera).
Rabah Khaloufi, 71, French Olympic boxer.
Eurico Dias Nogueira, 91, Portuguese Roman Catholic prelate, Archbishop of Braga (1977–1999).
Sam Greenlee, 83, American writer and filmmaker (The Spook Who Sat by the Door), natural causes.
Vincent Harding, 82, American civil rights activist and speechwriter (Martin Luther King, Jr.), complications from a heart aneurysm.
April Jace, 40, American athlete, shot.
Sante Kimes, 79, American murderer.
Gabriel Kolko, 81, American historian and author, passive euthanasia.
Mario Missiroli, 80, Italian director.
Zbigniew Pietrzykowski, 79, Polish boxer, Olympic silver (1960) and bronze medalist (1956, 1964).
Christine Quinn-Brintnall, 62, American judge, member (2000–2014) and Chief Judge (2012–2013) of the Washington Court of Appeals, melanoma.
Shekar, 48, Indian cartoonist.
Antanas Šurna, 75, Lithuanian actor.

20
Sandra Bem, 69, American psychologist, suicide by overdose.
Ross Brown, 79, New Zealand rugby union player (Taranaki, national team).
William Edgar Cohen, 72, American director.
Robyn Denny, 83, British artist.
Tadeusz Dominik, 86, Polish artist.
Chhanda Gayen, 34, Indian mountain climber, avalanche.
Arthur Gelb, 90, American newspaper editor and critic (The New York Times), complications from a stroke.
Jim Gulley, 75, American politician, member of the North Carolina House of Representatives (1996–2010).
Herbert Klausmeier, 98, American educational psychologist.
Prince Rupert Loewenstein, 80, British-German financial adviser (The Rolling Stones), Bavarian aristocrat.
Barbara Murray, 84, English actress (Passport to Pimlico, The Plane Makers), heart attack.
Rupert Pate, 96, American football player (Chicago Cardinals, Philadelphia Eagles).
Charles W. Robinson, 94, American businessman and diplomat, Deputy Secretary of State (1976–1977).
Phil Sharpe, 77, English cricketer (Yorkshire, national team).

21
Poni Adams, 95, American actress (House of Dracula, Batman and Robin).
Tunku Annuar, 74, Malaysian royal, heart attack.
Samuel A. Beatty, 91, American judge, member of the Alabama Supreme Court.
Mehroo Bengalee, 84, Indian academic.
Bi Hao, 86–87, Chinese military commander.
Paul-Émile Charbonneau, 92, Canadian Roman Catholic prelate, Bishop of Hull (1963–1973).
Duncan Cole, 55, English-born New Zealand footballer (national team).
Penny Dunbabin, 55, Australian field hockey player.
Johnny Gray, 87, American baseball player (Philadelphia Athletics/Kansas City Athletics).
Mack Herewini, 74, New Zealand rugby union player (Auckland, New Zealand Māori, All Blacks).
James Jones, 87, American politician, member of the South Dakota House of Representatives (1987–1988).
Abbas Kamandi, 62, Iranian Kurdish singer.
Karl-Hans Kern, 81, German politician.
Harmon Elwood Kirby, 80, American diplomat, Ambassador to Togo (1990–1994).
Ray Kunze, 86, American mathematician.
João Filgueiras Lima, 82, Brazilian architect, prostate cancer.
Jaime Lusinchi, 89, Venezuelan politician, President (1984–1989).
Hélène Pastor, 76–77, Monégasque heiress and businesswoman, injuries sustained in a shooting.
Alireza Soleimani, 58, Iranian Olympic freestyle wrestler (1992), world champion (1989), heart attack.
Than Nyein, 76, Burmese politician, founded the National Democratic Force, liver cancer.
R. Umanath, 92, Indian politician and political leader (CPI(M)), MP for Pudukottai (1962–1971), Tamil Nadu MLA for Nagapattinam (1977–1984).
Ruth Ziolkowski, 87, American museum executive, CEO of the Crazy Horse Memorial (since 1982), cancer.

22
Farid Aksheh, 93, Jordanian politician, Minister of Social Development and Labour (1967), Minister of Health (1972–1973).
Leonardo Andam, 55, Filipino pool player, motorcycle accident.
Vyacheslav Artashin, 42, Russian rugby league footballer.
Ted Blanchard, 84, Canadian politician.
Sergio Bustamante, 79, Mexican actor, heart attack.
Bobby Clark, American singer.
Matthew Cowles, 69, American actor and playwright (All My Children, Shutter Island, Oz).
Edward Howel Francis, 89, British geologist.
Imre Gedővári, 62, Hungarian fencer, Olympic champion (1988) and bronze medalist (1980).
Laurie Hill, 71, Australian VFL football player (Collingwood).
Donald Levine, 86, American toy executive, developer of the first action figure and G. I. Joe, cancer.
Wes Lofts, 71, Australian VFL football player and administrator (Carlton), emphysema.
Dragoljub Velimirović, 72, Serbian chess grandmaster.
Paolo Viganò, 64, Italian footballer.
Saleh Wreikat, 74, Jordanian politician, MP for Amman's fifth district.

23
Ranjith Abeysuriya, 82, Sri Lankan lawyer.
Mikhail Egorovich Alekseev, 64, Russian linguist.
Joel Camargo, 67, Brazilian footballer (Santos), renal failure.
Herman Dillon, 82, American Puyallup tribal executive, chairman and tribal leader, heart failure.
Mona Freeman, 87, American film actress.
Michael Gottlieb, 69, American director and screenwriter (Mannequin, Mr. Nanny), traffic collision.
Rolf Hermichen, 95, German Luftwaffe fighter ace, recipient of the Knight's Cross of the Iron Cross with Oak Leaves.
Richard Kolitsch, 24, German footballer, traffic collision.
Vivi Krogh, 94, Norwegian political activist.
Madhav Mantri, 92, Indian cricketer, was oldest-living Indian Test player, heart attack.
John McCormack, 79, Scottish light middleweight boxer, Olympic bronze medalist (1956) and European middleweight champion (1961-1962).
Anand Modak, 63, Indian musician and film composer, heart attack.
Gerald O'Leary, 81, American politician.
Andy Olsen, 83, American baseball umpire.
Nikolai Pastukhov, 91, Russian actor.
Panagiotis Poikilidis, 49, Greek Olympic wrestler (1984, 1992, 1996), stroke as a complication of an aortic aneurysm.
Uña Ramos, 80, Argentine musician.
Walter Romberg, 85, East German politician, Minister of Finance (1990).
Hugh Roy, 78, South African cricketer.
John Satterthwaite, 88, English Anglican prelate, Bishop of Gibraltar (1970–1993).
Ernst Strupler, 95, Swiss Olympic diver.

24
Joe Aitcheson Jr., 85, American steeplechase jockey.
Tariq Aziz Brisam, 68, Iraqi football player.
Lakshmi Kumari Chundawat, 97, Indian author and politician, MP (1972–1978) and Rajasthan MLA (1962–1971) for Devgarh, recipient of Padma Shri (1984), lung infection.
Stormé DeLarverie, 93, American LGBT activist, involved in the Stonewall Riots, dementia.
Arthur Getagazhev, 38, Russian Ingush militant leader, shot.
Klaus Herm, 89, German actor.
Mahafarid Amir Khosravi, 45, Iranian billionaire industrialist, convicted of embezzlement, execution by hanging.
Maurizio Mannelli, 84, Italian Olympic water polo player (1952).
Andrei Nikolaevich Mironov, 60, Russian journalist and human rights activist, mortar attack.
Steve Moore, 59, American comedian.
Knowlton Nash, 86, Canadian journalist, author and news anchor (The National).
Nitya Pibulsonggram, 72, Thai diplomat, Foreign Minister (2006–2008), Ambassador to the United States (1984–2000) and United Nations, stroke.
Andrea Rocchelli, 30, Italian photojournalist, mortar attack.
Conrad Rochat, 86, Swiss Olympic ski jumper.
Mark Selbee, 45, American kickboxer, drowning.
Roger Stanley, 71, American politician and informant, member of the Illinois House of Representatives (1977–1982), informant in George Ryan corruption case.
E. Don Taylor, 76, Jamaican Anglican prelate, Bishop of the Virgin Islands (1986–1994), Vicar of New York City (1994–2009), heart disease.
John Vasconcellos, 82, American politician, member of the California State Assembly (1966–1996) and Senate (1996–2004), organ failure.

25
David Allen, 78, English cricketer (Gloucestershire, national team).
Lila Ramkumar Bhargava, 92, Indian freedom fighter, social worker, and educationist.
Tommy Blom, 67, Swedish radio host and singer (Tages).
Lee Chamberlin, 76, American actress (The Electric Company, All My Children), cancer.
John Cole, 81, South African cricketer.
Marcel Côté, 71, Canadian economist and politician.
Peter Dunfield, 82, Canadian figure skater and Olympic coach (Elizabeth Manley).
Bertha Gilkey, 65, American community activist, cancer.
Wojciech Jaruzelski, 90, Polish military officer and politician, Prime Minister (1981–1985), Chairman of the Council of State (1985–1989), President (1989–1990).
Herb Jeffries, 100, American actor and jazz and traditional pop singer, heart failure.
Sir Toaripi Lauti, 85, Tuvaluan politician, Prime Minister of Tuvalu (1978–1981), Governor-General of Tuvalu (1990–1993).
John Maginnis, 66, American political writer, commentator and journalist.
Elmer Osmar Ramón Miani, 81, Argentinian Roman Catholic prelate, Bishop of Catamarca (1989–2007).
Berniece Baker Miracle, 94, American writer.
Matthew Saad Muhammad, 59, American Hall of Fame light heavyweight boxer, WBC champion (1979–1980), amyotrophic lateral sclerosis.
Jhonny Perozo, 29, Venezuelan footballer, shot.
Sir Robert Porter, 90, Northern Irish politician, Minister of Home Affairs and Health and Social Services (1969), MP (NI) for Queen's University of Belfast (1966–1969) and Lagan Valley (1969–1973).
Washington César Santos, 54, Brazilian footballer (national team), amyotrophic lateral sclerosis.
Malcolm Simmons, 68, British motorcycle speedway racer (Poole Pirates), World Team Cup Winner (1974, 1975, 1977), World Pairs Champion (1976, 1977, 1978), emphysema.
Robert Steinberg, 92, American mathematician.
Tang Yuhan, 101, Hong Kong oncologist.
Bunny Yeager, 85, American model and photographer, heart failure.

26
Albert Attalla, 82, American nuclear physicist.
Tommy Baxter, 84, New Zealand rugby league footballer.
Anna Berger, 91, American actress (Ghost World, The Sopranos, You Don't Mess with the Zohan).
Francesco d'Avalos, 84, Italian conductor and composer.
Baselios Thoma Didymos I, 92, Indian Orthodox Church hierarch, Catholicos of The East and Malankara Metropolitan (2005–2010).
Roland Dille, 89, American educator, President of Minn. St. Moorhead (1968–1994).
Arthur E. Drumm, 84, American inventor, environmentalist, and military subcontractor.
Mike Gordon, 60, American baseball player (Chicago Cubs), acute myeloid leukemia.
Sir John Gorman, 91, Northern Irish politician, MLA for North Down (1998–2003).
Princess Jin Moyu, 95, Chinese Manchurian royal (Qing dynasty).
Frances Kornbluth, 93, American painter.
Ma Man-kei, 94, Chinese Macanese politician.
Marcial Mes, 64, Belizean politician, first Mayan appointed to cabinet, member of the House of Representatives for Toledo West, traffic collision.
William R. Roy, 88, American politician and physician, member of the U.S. House of Reps for Kansas's 2nd District (1971–1975), complications following heart surgery.
Hooshang Seyhoun, 93, Iranian architect.
Manuel Uribe, 48, Mexican obese man, was world's third-heaviest person, liver failure.
Westmead Hawk, 10–11, English Greyhound, winner of the English Greyhound Derby (2005, 2006).
Peter Williams, 56, South African cricketer.
Shinichi Yamaji, 50, Japanese racing car driver.
Yu Chen Yueh-ying, 87, Taiwanese politician and judge, MP for Kaohsiung (1982–1985).

27
Dagfinn Aarskog, 85, Norwegian physician.
Shehu Abubakar, 76, Nigerian chieftain, Emir of Gombe (since 1984).
Giancarlo Bacci, 82, Italian footballer.
Harold Baer Jr., 81, American judge, S.D.N.Y. federal judge (since 1994), New York Supreme Court justice (1982–1992), internal bleeding after a fall.
Aurora Bretón, 65, Mexican Olympic archer (1972, 1984, 1988, 1992) and executive, President of the Mexican Archery Federation.
Roy Clyde Clark, 93, American bishop.
Hugh Austin Curtis, 81, Canadian politician, British Columbia MLA for Saanich and the Islands (1972–1986), cancer.
Dejan Drakul, 26, Bosnian-Herzegovinian football player, cancer.
Andor Elbert, 79, Canadian canoeist.
Ruth Flowers, 74, British disc jockey.
Robert Genn, 78, Canadian landscape artist.
Jack Joyce, 71, American business executive (Nike, Inc.), co-founder of Rogue Ales.
Kōji Kojima, 83, Japanese Olympic volleyball coach (1972), pneumonia.
Lochsong, 26, British thoroughbred sprinter racehorse, Horse of the Year (1993), Champion Sprinter (1993, 1994), colic.
Malcolm MacDonald, 66, Scottish music critic.
Mosoeu Magalefa, 65, South African navy officer, Chief of Naval Staff (2005–2009).
Miodrag Radulovacki, 81, Serbian medical research scientist.
Alf Ramsøy, 88, Norwegian long-distance runner, cross-country skier and actor.
Helma Sanders-Brahms, 73, German film director (Germany, Pale Mother).
Sigmund Kvaløy Setreng, 79, Norwegian philosopher.
Janice Scroggins, 58, American jazz pianist.
Charles Swithinbank, 87, British glaciologist.
Roberto Vargas, 84, American Puerto Rican baseball player (Milwaukee Braves).
Massimo Vignelli, 83, Italian graphic designer (New York City Subway map, American Airlines).

28
Maya Angelou, 86, American author (I Know Why the Caged Bird Sings), poet ("On the Pulse of Morning") and civil rights activist.
Fauzi Ayub, 47, Lebanese-Canadian militant (Hezbollah), FBI most wanted terrorist. (death announced on this date)
Azlan Shah of Perak, 86, Malaysian royal, Yang di-Pertuan Agong (1989–1994), Sultan of Perak (since 1984), Lord President of the Supreme Court (1982–1984), Chief Justice (1979–1982).
Pierre Bernard, 81, French footballer.
Rachel Berman, 68, American-born Canadian painter.
Stan Crowther, 78, English footballer.
Hernán Cruz Barnica, Honduran journalist, shot.
Ciro de Quadros, 74, Brazilian physician, cancer.
Christine Daure-Serfaty, 87, French human rights activist and writer.
Oscar Dystel, 101, American book publishing executive (Bantam Books), pioneered mass marketing of paperbacks.
Malcolm Glazer, 85, American real estate executive (First Allied Corporation) and sports franchise owner (Manchester United, Tampa Bay Buccaneers).
Dave Herman, 78, American radio personality (WNEW-FM), aneurysm.
Bob Houbregs, 82, Canadian Hall of Fame basketball player (University of Washington, Milwaukee Hawks, Detroit Pistons).
Ertuğrul Işınbark, 73, Turkish stage magician.
Isaac Kungwane, 43, South African football player (Kaizer Chiefs, national team) and commentator (SuperSport), complications from diabetes.
David Nadien, 88, American violinist.
Wyc Orr, 67, American politician, member of the Georgia House of Representatives (1988–1992).
Lawrence Paul, 79, Canadian Mi'kmaq politician, Chief and Chairman of Millbrook First Nation (1984–2012).
Jāzeps Pīgoznis, 79, Latvian landscape artist and academic, recipient of the Order of the Three Stars (2011).
Mordechai Piron, 92, Austrian-born Israeli chief military rabbi (Israel Defense Forces, 1969–1980).
James K. Randall, 84, American composer.
Jimmy Saxton, 74, American Hall of Fame football player (Texas Longhorns), dementia.
Peter Van de Wetering, 82, Dutch-born American horticulturist (Park Avenue, United Nations Plaza).

29
Bern Bennett, 92, American radio and television announcer.
Karlheinz Böhm, 86, Austrian actor (Peeping Tom, The Wonderful World of the Brothers Grimm).
Christine Charbonneau, 70, Canadian singer and songwriter.
Walter Jakob Gehring, 75, Swiss developmental biologist.
Peter Glaser, 90, Czech-born American scientist and aerospace engineer.
Maxine Greene, 96, American educational philosopher.
Stefans Grové, 91, South African composer.
Alfred Jaretzki III, 94, American surgeon and academic.
Rafael Mendiluce, 74, Spanish footballer.
Grigori Mints, 74, Russian philosopher and mathematician.
Ian Norman, 75, Australian businessman and retail executive, co-founder of Harvey Norman.
Miljenko Prohaska, 88, Croatian composer.
William M. Roth, 97, American shipping executive (Matson, Inc.), conservationist (Ghirardelli Square) and diplomat, U.S. Trade Representative (1967–1969).
Ken Schram, 66, American television (KOMO-TV) and radio journalist (KOMO-AM), infection.
Tito Torbellino, 31, American banda singer and musician, shot.
Willem van Asselt, 68, Dutch theologian, complications from a stroke.
Felisa Vanoff, 89, American dancer, choreographer, and theatrical producer, cancer.

30
Don Barry, 82, Canadian football player (Edmonton Eskimos).
Hienadz Buraukin, 77, Belarusian poet, journalist and diplomat, Ambassador to the United Nations (1990–1994), cancer.
Henning Carlsen, 86, Danish Bodil Award-winning film director (Hunger, People Meet and Sweet Music Fills the Heart).
Robert Costello, 93, American TV and film producer, writer, and director.
Richard Dürr, 75, Swiss footballer (Lausanne Sports).
Tod Ensign, American military veterans' rights lawyer.
Peter Hall, 86, New Zealand cricketer.
Jacques-André Hochart, 65, French cyclist.
Ron Kleemann, 76, American photorealist painter.
Joan Lorring, 88, British Hong Kong-born American actress (The Corn Is Green, Three Strangers).
Lyudmila Makarova, 92, Soviet-born Russian actress, People's Artist of the USSR (1977).
Hanna Maron, 90, German-born Israeli actress, recipient of the Israel Prize (1973).
Brad Mooney, 83, American rear admiral, Chief of Naval Research (1983–1987).
Satao, 45–46, Kenyan African elephant, poisoned arrow.
Michael Szameit, 64, German science fiction writer.
Idrissa Timta, 71–72, Nigerian chieftain, Emir of Gwoza (since 1981), shot.
Leonidas Vasilikopoulos, 82, Greek naval officer, Admiral and Chief of the Hellenic Navy General Staff (1986–1989) and the National Intelligence Service (1993–1996).

31
Mary Anthony, 97, American choreographer, modern dancer and dance teacher (Arthur Mitchell, Donald McKayle).
Marilyn Beck, 85, American syndicated entertainment journalist and columnist, lung cancer.
Jiří Bruder, 86, Czech actor.
Jack Casley, 88, English football player (Torquay, Headington) and scout.
Marinho Chagas, 62, Brazilian footballer (Botafogo, national team), gastrointestinal bleeding.
Jack Dittmer, 86, American baseball player (Boston Braves/Milwaukee Braves).
Joseph Dowling, 92, Irish politician.
Hoss Ellington, 79, American race car driver and team owner (NASCAR), cancer.
Martha Hyer, 89, American actress (Some Came Running, Sabrina).
Lewis Katz, 72, American media (The Philadelphia Inquirer, Philadelphia Daily News, YES Network) and sport franchise owner (New Jersey Nets and Devils), plane crash.
Pat McDonagh, 80, British-born Canadian fashion designer, cancer.
Brajanath Ratha, 78, Indian Oriya poet.
Margaret Rodgers, 75, Australian deaconess.
Jon Sandsmark, 72, Norwegian textile artist.
Steven H. Scheuer, 88, American film and television historian and critic, heart failure.
Mary Soames, Baroness Soames, 91, British aristocrat.
Sir Godfrey Taylor, 88, British local government leader.

References

2014-05
 05